The Sado mole or Tokuda's mole (Mogera tokudae) is a species of mammal in the family Talpidae. It is endemic to Sado Island, Japan.

References

 

Endemic mammals of Japan
Mogera
Mammals described in 1940
Taxa named by Nagamichi Kuroda
Taxonomy articles created by Polbot